Rear Admiral Sir John Lindsay,  (1737 – 4 June 1788) was a British naval officer of the 18th century, who achieved the rank of admiral late in his career. Joining the Navy during the Seven Years' War, he served off France, followed by service for several years as captain of a warship stationed in the West Indies. After war's end, he returned to Britain, serving as an MP for Aberdeen Burghs from 1767 to 1768. From August 1769 to March 1772 Lindsay was promoted to commodore and assigned as commander-in-chief of the East Indies Station. He resigned from the Navy for a period following the Battle of Ushant (1778) off the coast of France, during the American War of Independence. In 1784 he was assigned as commodore and commander-in-chief in the Mediterranean. In the last year of his life, he was promoted to rear admiral as an honorary position, as his failing health prevented him from taking a command.

He and his wife had no children together, but he was known to have three illegitimate children, including two daughters and a son, each by different women. One was Dido Elizabeth Belle, a mixed-race daughter born into slavery in 1761 in the West Indies. He entrusted the girl to his maternal uncle William Murray, 1st Earl of Mansfield to raise free in England. Murray served as Lord Chief Justice, ruling on cases important to the abolition of slavery. Belle was educated, married, and inherited money from Murray.

Family
He was born John Lindsay in 1737 to Sir Alexander Lindsay, 3rd Baronet of Evelix (near Dornoch in Easter Ross) and Amelia Murray, daughter of David Murray, 5th Viscount of Stormont. His mother was sister to William Murray, 1st Earl of Mansfield. Lindsay was educated as an aristocrat.

His sister Margaret Lindsay was tutored in painting by Allan Ramsay. In 1752 she eloped and married him as his second wife. Her parents became alienated from her by the marriage, which they disapproved. Her brother John remained loyal to her until her death in 1782.

Naval career
Lindsay joined the navy during the Seven Years' War between Great Britain and France. He was made a lieutenant in 1756 commanding the fireship Pluto. He participated in Sir Edward Hawke's 1757 expedition to attack Rochefort.

West Indies

On 29 September 1757, Lindsay was made captain of the 28-gun frigate HMS Trent, serving from 1757 to 1763. He served in both the West Indies and in home waters during the war. Trent was among ships used to try to capture Spanish ships in the Caribbean.

Trent was part of Sir George Pocock's fleet at the taking of Havana from the Spanish in 1762. During that action, Lindsay took over command of the 80-gun HMS Cambridge on 1 July when her commander William Goostrey was killed by rifle fire from the Morro Castle, which he was trying to capture.

For this and "many strong proofs of his valour" shown in the battle, he was rewarded with a permanent command of HMS Cambridge, the 70-gun HMS Marlborough or the 74-gun HMS Dragon (it is unknown which he chose, and he was still on the Trent in December 1763).  After his return to England following the conclusion of the war, Lindsay received a knighthood on 10 February 1764.

Lindsay returned to the West Indies, in command of the Tartar. His ship carried one of John Harrison's chronometers for tests and Thomas Erskine was serving as one of his midshipmen.

He returned to Britain in 1765, following the conclusion of the war. Lindsay was MP for Aberdeen Burghs from 1767 to 1768.

Marriage and family
While in the West Indies, Lindsay had a mixed-race daughter with an enslaved African woman, known as Maria Belle. They named her Dido Elizabeth Belle at her birth in 1761. Under colony slave law, the mixed-race girl was born into slavery. When she was very young, Lindsay took her back to England and entrusted her to his maternal uncle, Lord Mansfield, and his wife, who were childless. Dido was baptized in Bloomsbury in 1765. The Murrays raised the girl with an orphaned cousin whom they were also rearing, and educated her. She lived with them for 30 years (Murray bequeathed her a lump sum and an annuity in his will in 1793).

On 19 September 1768, Lindsay married Mary, daughter of Sir William Milner. They had no children. By the end of his life, he was known to have fathered at least one more illegitimate child, a son named John.

East Indies
From August 1769 to March 1772 Lindsay was promoted to commodore and assigned as commander-in-chief of the East Indies Station, flying his broad pennant flown from the frigate Stag. While in India, he was awarded the Order of the Bath (28 June 1770), though he was still a relatively junior sea officer. He was ordered to investigate dealings between the British East India Company and the Indian nawabs. This made him unpopular with the company and he was soon recalled.

Ushant

From March to May 1778, he was the first captain of the first-rate HMS Victory. He was assigned as captain of the 90-gun HMS Prince George when Admiral Keppel decided to raise his flag in Victory (with John Campbell as his flag captain) after the ship's commissioning in May 1778. Lindsay commanded the Prince George in the disastrous Battle of Ushant on 27 July 1778. After giving evidence against Sir Hugh Palliser to the ensuing courts martial, he resigned straight after Keppel. He refused to accept any command during Lord Sandwich's administration of the Admiralty, thus missing the American War of Independence.

Later life and death
Sandwich and his successors appreciated Lindsay's ability, and he was appointed as Admiralty Commissioner between April and December 1783. He next was assigned as commodore and commander-in-chief in the Mediterranean, with HMS Trusty as his flagship. At Naples 24 June 1784, he entertained the king and queen of Sicily on board his ship.

Soon afterward, his health began to fail and he had to return to England. He was promoted to "rear admiral of the red" on 24 September 1787. For health reasons he held it as an honorary role rather than an active one. He died at Marlborough, on his way from a health trip to Bath, on 4 June 1788, aged fifty-one. He is buried in Westminster Abbey.

Mansfield family tree

Notes

Sources
R. Beatson, Naval and military memoirs of Great Britain, 3 vols. (1790)
J. Charnock, ed., Biographia navalis, 6 (1798)
E. Haden-Guest, "Lindsay, John", Houses of Parliament records, Commons, 1754–90, 3.44
DNB
British Library, material on his appointment and some of his correspondence with the East India Company, Add. MS 18020

|-

Burials at Westminster Abbey
Knights Companion of the Order of the Bath
Lords of the Admiralty
Members of the Parliament of Great Britain for Scottish constituencies
Royal Navy rear admirals
1788 deaths
1737 births
John
Clan Murray
Younger sons of baronets
British MPs 1761–1768
British Governors of Martinique